Franklin Land District is one of the twenty land districts of Tasmania which are part of the Cadastral divisions of Tasmania. It used to be Franklin County, one of the 18 counties of Tasmania. Frenchmans Cap mountain is located there. It includes most of the Franklin-Gordon Wild Rivers National Park.

See also

Lands administrative divisions of Australia

References

Land Districts of Tasmania
Western Tasmania